The 2014 Mid-American Conference men's basketball tournament was the post-season basketball tournament for the Mid-American Conference (MAC) 2013–14 college basketball season. The 2014 tournament was held March 10–15. Top-seeded Western Michigan defeated Toledo in the tournament final.  In the NCAA tournament they lost to Syracuse.

Format
First round games were held on campus sites at the higher seed on March 10. The remaining rounds were held at Quicken Loans Arena, between March 12–15. As with the recent tournaments, the top two seeds received byes into the semifinals, with the three and four seeds receiving a bye to the quarterfinals.

Seeds

Schedule

Bracket

References

Mid-American Conference men's basketball tournament
Tournament
MAC men's basketball tournament
MAC men's basketball tournament
Basketball competitions in Cleveland
College baseball tournaments in Ohio